"Let's Shake Hands" is the debut 7" single of Detroit-based American garage rock band The White Stripes. It was released in March 1998, and marks their first recording. A live recording of the song is featured on Under Blackpool Lights as well as Under Great White Northern Lights.

"Let's Shake Hands" was the first song the band recorded in their living room for Dave Buick, who offered to finance the release of their first single.  The style surprised Buick based on the band's live performances, but—according to an interview with The New Yorker—Jack said it was "a declaration that the White Stripes weren’t going to observe punk proprieties." The song showcases the early garage punk sound of the band in its infancy. The single is backed with a cover of "Look Me Over Closely," a song written for Marlene Dietrich by folk musician Terry Gilkyson.

A second edition of 1,000 copies was pressed on black vinyl in 2002. The cover for this repressing was a better quality version of the original photo. There was a "secret" third pressing in 2008 with a stenciled version of the original cover art by Dion Fischer. It was pressed on black vinyl and 1,000 hand-numbered copies were produced. Highly coveted among diehard fans, this 7" remains one of the rarest and priciest items in The White Stripes' entire discography.

Track listing

References

External links
White Stripes.net. Retrieved January 1, 2006.
White Stripes.net FAQ. Retrieved January 1, 2006.
Live recording of "Let's Shake Hands," Silverlake, California, 2001
Live recording of "Look Me Over Closely," Berlin, Germany, 2005

1998 debut singles
The White Stripes songs
1998 songs
Songs written by Jack White
Wikipedia requested audio of songs